Austin Bernard Vaughan (September 27, 1927 – June 25, 2000) was an American prelate of the Catholic Church who served as Auxiliary bishop of the Archdiocese of New York from 1977 to 2000.

Biography
Born in New York City, Vaughan was ordained a priest on December 8, 1951, for the Archdiocese of New York.

On May 24, 1977, he was named auxiliary bishop of the New York Archdiocese and titular bishop of 'Cluain Iraird' and was consecrated bishop on June 29, 1977.

Bishop Vaughan died in office aged 72 on June 25, 2000 – four days before the 23rd anniversary of his episcopal consecration.

In the Catholic New Yorker, January 1987, Bishop Vaughan described himself as "one of the most conservative bishops in the Catholic Church, USA. (He was entrusted with the translation into English from the Latin of official Vatican documents. But he went on to say in his Catholic New Yorker newspaper article that he was enthralled by his attendance at an Epiphany celebration, January 6, 1987.  The Service of the Word and Eucharist was held in Saint Peter's Lutheran Church, Port Jervis, New York. Bishop Vaughan was then the Ordinary bishop of Orange County, NY.  The preacher at the Service, and concelebrant in the Lutheran Service was Professor Dr. William Lazareth, former Theological Secretary of the World Council of Churches; editor of the WCC document, "Baptism, Eucharist, Ministry."  Having been newly consecrated and installed in the New York Cathedral of St. John the Divine, Bishop Lazareth's first public act was to attend the Service in St. Peter's.  Ordinary parishioners from both the Lutheran and Catholic parishes were in attendance (naturally, the Roman Catholics were not permitted to receive Holy Communion), but the nuns from Mother Teresa's Mercy Hospital, Port Jervis, were present at the luncheon served by the Ladies aid Society of St. Peter's.  The whole event was a celebration of this writer's 20th anniversary of his ordination in the Cathedral of Västeros (designated at the Second Vatican council in Latin as Arosenius) and Anderson's first Högmässa (High Mass) at Sankt Ansgars Kapell, Rättvik, Sweden.  Local Catholic priests in Port Jervis remember Bishop Vaugha nas a staunch supporter of the Right to Life movement.  This writer remembers him as a true pastor pastorum engaged in Christian charity for the poor and destitute in Middletown and his whole Orange County diocese. And as a truly ecumenical catholic.   JoeLupo Anderson, Pastor emeritus, Archdiocese of Uppsala.

Notes

1927 births
2000 deaths
Clergy from New York City
20th-century Roman Catholic bishops in the United States
American anti-abortion activists
New York (state) Democrats
Presidents of the Catholic Theological Society of America